Lake Newell is a lake located in the Gibson Desert, in the Goldfields-Esperance region of Western Australia, northeast of Lake Breaden.

See also

 List of lakes of Western Australia

References

Newell